Saint-Elzéar, Quebec may refer to:

Saint-Elzéar, Gaspésie–Îles-de-la-Madeleine, Quebec, in Bonaventure Regional County Municipality
Saint-Elzéar, Chaudière-Appalaches, Quebec, in La Nouvelle-Beauce Regional County Municipality
Saint-Elzéar-de-Témiscouata, Quebec, in Témiscouata Regional County Municipality, formerly known simply as Saint-Elzéar
 Saint-Elzéar, Laval, Quebec